Leander Franklin "Big Dan" Abbott (March 16, 1862 – February 13, 1930) was a pitcher in Major League Baseball.

External links

1862 births
1930 deaths
Major League Baseball pitchers
Baseball players from Ohio
Toledo Maumees players
19th-century baseball players
People from Portage, Ohio
Saginaw (minor league baseball) players
Terre Haute Hottentots players
Peoria Distillers players
Grand Rapids Shamrocks players